National Tertiary Route 709, or just Route 709 (or ) is a National Road Route of Costa Rica, located in the Alajuela province.

Description
In Alajuela province the route covers Naranjo canton (Naranjo, Cirrí Sur districts).

References

Highways in Costa Rica